FEED may refer to:

 FEED Projects, an international hunger-fighting charity
 Foundation for European Economic Development, a charity formed in November 1990 under the auspices of European Association for Evolutionary and Political Economy
 Front-End Engineering Design , a process for conceptual development of processing industry projects